Fussballclub Biel-Bienne is a Swiss association football club based in Biel/Bienne. They currently play in the 2. Liga Interregional.

Honours
Swiss championship
Champions: 1946–47
Runners-up: 1947–48, 1959–60

Swiss Cup
Runners-up: 1960–61

Stadium

Notable past players

Current squad
As of 17 January 2023.

Out on loan

External links
Official website 
Soccerway profile 
Football.ch profile 

 
Football clubs in Switzerland
Association football clubs established in 1896
FC Biel-Bienne
FC Biel-Bienne